My 3 Addictions is the third official CD release from antifolk music group Elastic No-No Band and their first studio album.

It is a concept album inspired partially by the 2-part structure of Willie Nelson's Phases and Stages album. My 3 Addictions has a 3-part structure, based on the three addictions listed in the title song: food, movies, and women.

An interactive album
On September 3, 2007, Elastic No-No Band's lead singer and songwriter, Justin Remer, started posting a blog called "My 3 Addictions: An interactive album".  The first entry contained an mp3 download of the title song, in addition to various anecdotes about the making of the song and additional mp3 downloads of alternate versions of the song.  Each successive entry included streaming audio of one of the album's songs, anecdotes related to that song, and mp3 downloads of alternate versions of that song.  Now, the entire album can be heard, mostly as streaming audio, from the blog.

Track listing

Original album
 "My 3 Addictions"
 "Part 1: Food"
 "Cheese Fries"
 "Coffee Den"
 "Sundaes on a Sunday Afternoon"
 "Part 2: Movies"
 "Woody Allen Surrogate (Kenneth Branagh's Blues)"
 "The Guy Who Dies"
 "I Am Klaus Kinski (And This Is My Song)"
 "Part 3: Girls Who..."
 "(Everywhere I Look) I See Your Face"
 "I'm in Lust"
 "A Modest Proposal (For Laura Cantrell)"
 "My 3 Addictions (postlude reprise)"
 "Nobody's Wife (You're The One)"

2013 Deluxe Edition Bonus Tracks
 "Woody Allen Surrogate (Kenneth Branagh's Blues)" (Live, 2007) - previously unreleased
 "My 3 Addictions" (Solo Demo Version) - from Not Like Most Folkies, Part 1 compilation
 "Cheese Fries Waltz" - from Black No-No's album
 "Coffee Den" (Solo Demo Version) - from Not Like Most Folkies, Part 1 compilation
 "(Everywhere I Look) I See Your Face" (Solo Demo Version) - from Not Like Most Folkies, Part 1 compilation
 "I'm in Lust" (Live, 2008) - from Black No-No's album
 "A Modest Proposal (For Laura Cantrell)" (Solo Demo Version) - from Not Like Most Folkies, Part 1 compilation
 "I Am Klaus Kinski (And This Is My Song)" (Live, 2010; with Joe Crow Ryan) - from Charmingly Shambolic and Mostly Live album
 "Demented Elevator Music, Pt. 1" - previously unreleased
 "Demented Elevator Music, Pt. 2" - previously unreleased

Personnel

Elastic No-No Band
Doug Johnson - drums, Tambourine, cowbell, Washboard
Justin Remer - vocals, Acoustic Guitar, Synths
Herb Scher - Piano, keyboards
Preston Spurlock - Bass, Melodica, Glockenspiel, Electribe

Guests
Debe Dalton - Banjo
Dibson T. Hoffweiler - Electric Guitar
Frank Hoier - Harmonica
Casey Holford - Electric Guitar
Tianna Kennedy - Cello
Angel O. Mendez - Electric Guitar
Sammy Shuster - Duet Vocals

References

External links
My 3 Addictions: An interactive album
What is My 3 Addictions?
Elastic No-No Band website

2007 albums
Elastic No-No Band albums